"Entertainer" is a song by English singer-songwriter Zayn. It was released through RCA Records
as the second single from his second studio album, Icarus Falls, on 23 May 2018. Zayn wrote the song with producer Henrique Andrade and co-producer Alexandre Bursztyn, alongside Iliana Nedialkova. He recorded the song in a studio in Doylestown, Pennsylvania.

Release and promotion 
Zayn teased the song the day before its official release with a cryptic teaser from the video uploaded on his Twitter account. Later on, an official Malik update account tweeted a GIF from the video and the indication of Shazam with Malik's previous single, "Let Me", to unlock an exclusive teaser of the video before its official release.

Music video
The official music video for "Entertainer" was released alongside the song on 23 May 2018. It continues a storyline from his previous two singles, "Dusk Till Dawn" from 2017 and "Let Me" from 2018.  The music video stars Malik alongside Cuban-American actor Steven Bauer and American model Sofia Jamora. Malik is seen going to a strip club, where he spots his love interest. The two spend a sensual night together. But when his lady love disappears in the morning, Zayn returns to the club to track her down. Billboard called the video "seductive".

Critical reception
Lauren O'Neill of Noisey gave the song a positive review, stating that Zayn "finally leans into his potential" and the song "feels like a subtle arrival for someone who hadn't quite nailed down his sound." She said the laid-back synths suit Zayn's personality, the chorus "has a bit of a fire underneath" it, and Zayn vocally "has one of the best falsetto ranges" in pop music.

Charts

Certifications

References

2018 singles
2018 songs
Songs written by Zayn Malik
Zayn Malik songs